Kakahi was a station on the North Island Main Trunk line, in the Ruapehu District of New Zealand, serving Kakahi. It formally opened on 9 November 1908. The rails were laid south of Piriaka by May 1904 and a daily ballast train was running by October, which also carried passengers. It crosses the Kakahi Stream, which was sometimes called the Waitea River.

An island platform and shelter were built in 1907, extended to  x  in 1908, with a lobby, urinals and a storeroom, plus a  x  goods shed. A stockyard was added in 1912 and extended in 1945, but closed on 26 January 1971. The shelter was removed in 1958 and the building on 26 November 1966, though in 1968 a new  x  weatherboard, lean-to shelter was built for parcels and phones. The passing loop for 31 wagons was extended for 66 in 1937.

Electric block tablet signalling was installed in 1913, a new type of exchanger installed in 1965 and Centralised Traffic Control started on 15 May 1967.

An engine turning triangle was built in 1951/1952 south of the viaduct, but appears to have been disused by 1969.

On Sunday 25 June 1978 Kakahi closed to all traffic, though the loop remains in use.

Incidents 
From Piriaki, through Kakahi, to just south of Ōwhango, the line climbs a hill on the west side of the Whakapapa River, increasing to a maximum gradient of 1 in 50 on the Ōwhango bank. As early as 1906 groynes were added to protect the line from the river and a cutting collapsed. In 1908 it was noted that the hill was slipping, engines were derailed in 1915 1925 and 1959, trains were delayed in 1918, 1924, 1925, 1926, 1933, 1939, 1940 and 1945 and a length of railway was realigned in 1923. The 1933 disruption was long enough for an advert to refer to the 3/- charge for the bus replacement link.

Sawmill 
About 45 staff worked the mill. It was transferred from PWD to NZR on 30 July1909 and £3000 was spent on improvements. Electric light was installed in 1912, but in 1914 the  tramway was in a bad condition, in 1917 the sawmill was dismantled and in 1921 the sidings were removed. However, in 1955 a siding was provided for Kakahi Timber Co Ltd.

See also 
Taupo railway proposals - Kakahi-Pukawa line

References

External links 

 1904 photo of groynes being built in the Whanganui River
1905 photo of bridge construction
 1908 photo in Auckland Weekly News
 1908 photo of viaduct
 1911 photo of Piriaka
 Video - train at Piriaka in 2017

Railway stations in New Zealand
Ruapehu District
Rail transport in Manawatū-Whanganui
Buildings and structures in Manawatū-Whanganui
Railway stations opened in 1904
Railway stations closed in 1978